Charmco is an unincorporated community and coal town in Greenbrier County, West Virginia, United States. Charmco is located at the junction of U.S. Route 60 and West Virginia Route 20, northeast of Rainelle. Charmco has a post office with ZIP code 25958. The community was named for the Charleston Milling Company.

References

Unincorporated communities in Greenbrier County, West Virginia
Unincorporated communities in West Virginia
Coal towns in West Virginia